Sergio Emilio Charles Garduño (October 12, 1956 – December 28, 2012) was a Mexican luchador (or professional wrestler), who is best known under the ring name Emilio Charles Jr. Over the years, Charles worked for all of the major Mexican professional wrestling promotions, including Consejo Mundial de Lucha Libre (CMLL), Asistencia Asesoría y Administración and International Wrestling Revolution Group.

He is also one of the founding members of the wrestling group called Los Destructores ("the Destroyers"), along with Vulcano and Tony Arce. He was also a key member of the group Los Guapos ("the Handsome Ones"), as well as a group called Los Talibanes (the Taliban), both with longtime wrestling partners and friends Scorpio Jr. and Bestia Salvaje.

Personal life
Sergio Emilio Charles Garduño was born on October 12, 1956, in Monterrey, Nuevo León, Mexico. His father was a professional wrestler in the 1940s and 1950, and was known under the ring name Emilio Charles.

Professional wrestling career
While his father was a professional wrestler, Emilio Charles Jr. was not trained by him; instead, he was trained by Diablo Velasco and Abuelo Carrillo before making his debut in February 1980.

Los Destructores (1987–1990)
In the mid-1980s, he joined up with the real life-brother tag team of Tony Arce and Vulcano, to form a trio known as  Los Destructores ("the Destroyers"). The group was created in the same vein as Los Infernales, a trio of rudos (bad guys) who worked well together and could produce top-quality matches with a variety of opponents. On January 31, 1988, Los Destructores defeated Hombre Bala, Jerry Estrada, and Pirata Morgan to win the Mexican National Trios Championship. Los Destructores held the titles for almost two years and had a series of championship defenses that drew packed houses all over Mexico. While teaming with Arce and Vulcano, Charles also worked as a singles wrestler, including a long drawn-out storyline with Atlantis. The storyline saw Charles win the NWA World Middleweight Championship from Atlantis on July 17, 1988, only to lose it back to him eleven days later. Charles became a two time NWA Middleweight champion on August 12, 1988, when he defeated Atlantis for the title once more. His run as a double champion ended on April 28, 1989, when Ángel Azteca won the Middleweight title. On November 20, 1989, Los Destructores lost the trios title to Black Terry, Jose Luis Feliciano, and Shu El Guerrero. Not long after the title loss, Charles left Los Destructores, who decided to replace him with Rocco Valente instead.

On August 30, 1990, Charles defeated Javier Cruz to win the Mexican National Middleweight Championship, holding it until November 20, when he lost the belt to Octagón. Charles remained active in the Middleweight division for over three years, defeating El Dandy to win the CMLL World Middleweight Championship on December 16, 1992. He held the championship for almost ten months before Dandy regained the title on October 5, 1993.

Los Chacales (1995–1996)
In early 1995, Charles formed a trio with Bestia Salvaje and Sangre Chicana, referred to as Los Chacales (Spanish for "The Jackals"). The trio was one of eight teams competing in the Salvador Lutteroth Trios Tournament in March 1994. Los Chacales defeated La Ola Blanca (Dr. Wagner Jr., Gran Markus Jr., and El Hijo del Gladiador) in the opening round, Dos Caras, El Dandy, and Héctor Garza in semifinals, and finally Los Brazos (Brazo de Oro, Brazo de Plata, and El Brazo) in the finals of the one-night tournament. The following week, Los Chacales defeated La Ola Blanca to win the CMLL World Trios Championship, becoming the sixth overall championship team. Los Chacales' reign as CMLL World Trios Champions lasted 357 days, before they lost it to Dos Caras, La Fiera, and Héctor Garza at the first Homenaje a Salvador Lutteroth show on March 22, 1996.

On September 1, Charles and Apolo Dantés won CMLL's Second Generation Tag Team Tournament. While most participants were second-generation wrestlers like Charles, the tournament also included some fictional family relationships, like Hijo del Gladiador. In 1997, the makeshift team of Charles, El Satánico, and Rey Bucanero defeated Apolo Dantés, Black Warrior, and Dr. Wagner Jr. in the finals of a one-night eight-team tournament to win the CMLL World Trios Title. The team only held onto the championship for a month before losing to La Ola Azul ("The Blue Wave"; Atlantis, Lizmark, and Mr. Niebla) on April 29, 1997. A few months later, Charles and Wagner defeated Atlantis and Brazo de Plata in the final of an eight-team tournament to win the vacant CMLL World Tag Team Championship. While not being a regular team, the two managed to defend the title for five months before losing it to Mr. Niebla and Shocker on January 23, 1998.

Los Guapos (1999–2002)
After Shocker lost his mask at the CMLL 66th Anniversary Show, he stated he was okay with being unmasked since his face was "1000% Guapo" ("1000% Handsome"). He  developed a narcissistic, self-obsessed rudo character, who exhibited various metrosexual traits and treated those who were not as handsome as him with scorn. In the following months, Shocker would often team up with Bestia Salvaje and Scorpio Jr. Following a series of vignettes, Shocker convinced both of his partners to have their hair bleached blond and that they were also Guapo like him forming a group known as Los Guapos. Scorpio Jr., and Bestia Negra were both older, seasoned veteran wrestlers and neither were actually considered attractive, in fact. Scorpio, Jr.'s nickname up until this point had been El Rey Feo ("The Ugly King").

In 2000, Shocker was invited to work for New Japan Pro-Wrestling (NJPW) on several occasions and due to his NJPW tours of Japan Scorpio Jr. and Bestia Negra often found themselves without a partner for Trios matches. Their solution was to bring in Emilio Charles Jr. to become the fourth Guapo team member, Charles Jr. like his partners used the Guapo name more ironically than factual. After returning from NJPW Shocker objected to someone joining "his" group without his approval, but at first agreed to it. Over the following months, Shocker's displeasure with the rest of the team grew, and eventually, he split from the team, turning tecnico in the process. Shocker began a long-running storyline feud with Los Guapos. The storyline built to its peak at the 2001 Sin Piedad show on December 14. In the main event, Shocker defeated Emilio Charles Jr. in a Lucha de Apuestas match, forcing Charles to have all his hair shaved off as a result of his loss. As a result of the victory, Shocker regained the rights to the "Los Guapos" name.

Los Talibanes (2002–2004)
While Shocker reformed Los Guapos, initially with Máscara Mágica and later El Terrible, Bestia Salvaje, Scorpio Jr., and Emilio Charles Jr. became known as Los Talibanes (The Taleban). As part of their image change, all three wrestlers began wearing Bedouin robes and headdresses to the ring, pretending to be part of the terrorist group. The feud with Shocker and his group continued over the next two years, including several multi-man Lucha de Apuestas matches. On August 1, 2003, El Terrible defeated Bestia Salvaje in a domo de la muerte steel cage match that also included the other members of Los Talibanes and Los Guapos. The feud culminated in another six-way Lucha de Apuestas match on September 24, 2004, ending with Shocker pinning Bestia Salvaje, forcing him to have his hair shaved off afterward.

Final years (2005–2011)
Charles' schedule slowed down from 2005 to 2007, with him only working two notable storylines in that time period. The first one saw Charles shaved bald as a result of losing a Lucha de Apuesta, to Máximo on October 29, 2006. In the last notable feud Charles worked, he wrestled newcomer Máscara Purpura in a series of matches, culminating in a Lucha de Apuesta bout on September 16, 2007, that Charles lost and was shaved bald as a result. After leaving CMLL in 2007, Charles worked a limited number of matches for International Wrestling Revolution Group in 2009 and two matches on the independent circuit in 2011. His last recorded match taking place on December 3, 2011, as he, Fuerza Guerrera and Juventud Guerrera lost to Los Payasos (Coco Amarillo, Coco Azul, and Coco Rojo) by disqualification.

Death
Charles died in 2012 of kidney failure.

Championships and accomplishments
Consejo Mundial de Lucha Libre (CMLL)
CMLL World Middleweight Championship (2 times)
CMLL World Tag Team Championship (1 time) – with Dr. Wagner Jr.
CMLL World Trios Championship (2 times) – with Sangre Chicana and Bestia Salvaje (Los Chacales), El Satánico and Rey Bucanero
Mexican National Middleweight Championship (1 time)
Mexican National Trios Championship (1 time) – with Vulcano and Tony Arce (Los Destructores)
NWA World Middleweight Championship (2 times)
Distrito Federal Heavyweight Championship (1 time)
Second Generation Tag Team Tournament (1995) – with Apolo Dantés
Salvador Lutteroth Trios Tournament – with Bestia Salvaje and Sangre Chicana

Luchas de Apuestas record

Footnotes

References

1956 births
2012 deaths
Deaths from kidney failure
Mexican male professional wrestlers
Professional wrestlers from Nuevo León
Sportspeople from Monterrey
20th-century professional wrestlers
21st-century professional wrestlers
Mexican National Middleweight Champions
Mexican National Trios Champions
CMLL World Middleweight Champions
CMLL World Tag Team Champions
CMLL World Trios Champions
NWA World Middleweight Champions
UWA World Tag Team Champions